Han Krug (21 December 1890 – 20 March 1977) was a Dutch painter. His work was part of the painting event in the art competition at the 1936 Summer Olympics. Krug's work was included in the 1939 exhibition and sale Onze Kunst van Heden (Our Art of Today) at the Rijksmuseum in Amsterdam.

References

1890 births
1977 deaths
20th-century Dutch painters
Dutch male painters
Olympic competitors in art competitions
Artists from The Hague
20th-century Dutch male artists